Terminalia latipes is a tree of the family Combretaceae native to northern Australia.

It blooms between October and February producing white flowers.

It is found among rocky outcrops and on hills, floodplains and coastal dunes in the Kimberley region of Western Australia growing in sandy-loam-clay soils over sandstone.

References

latipes
Trees of Australia
Flora of the Northern Territory
Rosids of Western Australia
Plants described in 1864
Taxa named by George Bentham